The Kleiner Rettenstein is a  mountain in the Austrian state of Tyrol. It lies in the Kitzbühel Alps, roughly east of its larger brother, the Großer Rettenstein.

Gallery 

Mountains of the Alps
Mountains of Tyrol (state)
Mountains of Salzburg (state)
Two-thousanders of Austria
Kitzbühel Alps